Indigenous Peoples' Day may refer to:

 International Day of the World's Indigenous Peoples, a United Nations event recognised as a public holiday in various countries
 Indigenous Peoples' Day (United States), a day recognizing Indigenous Peoples in the United States
 National Indigenous Peoples Day, a day recognizing First Nations in Canada
 Indigenous Peoples Day (Brazil), annual celebration honouring the indigenous peoples of Brazil